"An Isouna Agapi" (Greek: Αν Ήσουνα Αγάπη) is the second single by Greek singer Helena Paparizou from her fifth studio album Giro Apo T'Oneiro, written by Giorgos Sabanis and Niki Papatheohari. The song was chosen for "Best Song in Balkans from Greece" at the Balkan Music Awards 2010.

Composition
The music was composed by singer-songwriter Giorgos Sabanis while the lyrics were written by Niki Papatheohari.  The song is an uptempo ballad.

Release
"An Isouna Agapi" was announced as the second single, with a release date of 25 February. However, the song debuted exclusively on Dromos FM 89.8 one day earlier.  The radio station announced a contest for its audience coinciding with the single's release date: the winners will get the chance to meet Paparizou and hear her new album before it is released on 28 February 2010 at seven pm at an undisclosed venue.

Chart performance
"An Isouna Agapi" peaked at #5 on the official Greek Digital Singles chart published by Billboard. It also peaked at #7 at the official Greek airplay chart by Nielsen Music Control.

Music video
Paparizou announced on her Twitter that she was meeting with video director Konstantinos Rigos to discuss a music video for the single. The filming of the music video took place on 4 March at the Astir Palace hotel and lasted 16 hours. Paparizou then posted photos from the video on her Twitter, asking fans for their critiques. The music video is mostly in black and white. It was nominated for Sexiest Appearance in a Video, as well as contributing to nominations for Female Artist of the Year and Artist of the Year at the MAD Video Music Awards 2010.

Track listing
"An Isouna Agapi"

Charts

Notes

External links
Ivi "Vges Sto Gyali" official site

2010 singles
Helena Paparizou songs
Pop ballads
Songs written by Giorgos Sabanis
2010 songs
Greek-language songs